Ramendra Kumar Podder was a Bengali Indian scholar of biochemistry, who served as the Vice Chancellor of the University of Calcutta. He was a Member of Parliament, representing West Bengal in the Rajya Sabha the upper house of India's Parliament as a member of the Communist Party of India (Marxist).

He was educated at the renowned Scottish Church College in Calcutta, and at the University of Calcutta. He would serve as the Vice Chancellor of the University of Calcutta from 20 June 1979 to 30 December 1983.

References

Scottish Church College alumni
University of Calcutta alumni
Vice Chancellors of the University of Calcutta
Indian biochemists
20th-century Indian chemists
Bengali scientists
Rajya Sabha members from West Bengal
Communist Party of India (Marxist) politicians
1930 births
Living people